Congresswoman Jones may refer to:

 Brenda Jones
 Stephanie Tubbs Jones

Title and name disambiguation pages